Gustavsberg is a Swedish porcelain company that originated in 1826.
It broke up in the 1990s and was sold off in pieces, to the dismay of residents of the Gustavsberg area, but artisans continued producing ceramics and household porcelain in the Gustavsberg tradition. One of Gustavsberg's most famous collections is the "Nobel Porcelain" produced in 1994. 
One such artisan was Josef Ekberg, who, even as a young man, created many pieces for Gustavsberg.

Museum
The Gustavsberg Porcelain Museum is an art, design and industrial history museum in Gustavsberg, which  has its origins in objects gradually preserved from the Gustavsberg Porcelain Factory production. The museum was not originally open for public viewing,  but from 1956 there has been a museum open to the public. It is now run by Värmdö municipality. The municipality owns the property on the original factory site, while the object collection was donated to the National Museum  by the previous owner to Gustavsbergs Factories, "Kooperativa Förbundet" (the Cooperative Union).

The basic exhibitions showing the history of porcelain from an international perspective, porcelain manufacture in Gustavsberg since the early 1800s, designs of Gustav's studio, in particular, Wilhelm Kåge, Stig Lindberg and Bernt Friberg and examples of functional porcelain from the 1900s.

The Museum Director is Kjell Lööw.

Gallery

See also

Bernadotte & Kylberg

References 

^ [a b c] 
^ Svensk uppslagsbok, Malmö 1932
^ Tusenkonstnären Stig Lindberg, Gisela Eronn, kapitel "Serviser för folkhemmet",

Further reading
Minardi, Robin Hecht, "Scandinavian Art Pottery: Denmark and Sweden", Schiffer Publishing Ltd., Rev. 2nd Ed., 2005, p. 131-143,

External links

Vintage ceramics website
The Gustavsbergs Porcelain Museum website

Porcelain
Ceramics manufacturers of Sweden
Purveyors to the Court of Sweden
Wärtsilä
Manufacturing companies established in 1826
Companies disestablished in the 1990s
1826 establishments in Sweden
1990s disestablishments in Sweden
Swedish companies established in 1826